White van may refer to:
 White van man, a stereotypical tradesman in the United Kingdom. 
 White van speaker scam, a confidence trick involving the sale of poor quality goods.
 White vans, the vehicles used in enforced disappearances in Sri Lanka.